The finals and the qualifying heats of the Women's 4×200 metres Freestyle Relay event at the 1993 FINA Short Course World Championships were held in Palma de Mallorca, Spain.

Final

References
 Results

R
1993 in women's swimming